The 1970 New Mexico State Aggies football team was an American football team that represented New Mexico State University as an independent during the 1970 NCAA University Division football season. In their third year under head coach Jim Wood, the Aggies compiled a 4–6 record and were outscored by a total of 282 to 277. The team played its home games at Memorial Stadium in Las Cruces, New Mexico.

Schedule

References

New Mexico State
New Mexico State Aggies football seasons
New Mexico State Aggies football